Virgin Millionaires are an American rock band from Indianapolis, Indiana. Founded by Zach Baldauf after three years as the guitarist of Transmatic. With the success of their EP the band began doing shows with bands like Kid Rock, 311, Hoobastank, and Puddle of Mudd. In 2006, they played at the opening of the Indianapolis 500. The band did a mini-spring 2008 tour with the band Hurt in the Midwest and summer 2008 had the band playing dates with artists including Daughtry, Sugar Ray, Spin Doctors, Spill Canvas and Matt Nathanson. 

The band was an early adopter of MySpace Music and was at times ranked, based on song plays, as the "Top Unsigned Artist" in the state of Indiana in the mid 2000s. The band has been dormant since the release of the Murdered Out EP in 2011 and has had no active social media presence, music releases, or live performances for the last decade.

Members 
Zack Baldauf - lead vocals and guitar
Michael Carson - bass and vocals
KC Carson - guitar
Derek Hanson - drums

Former Members
Ryan Flynn - bass
Matt Carter - guitar
Dave "Moose" Kuhel - bass
Jordan Enyart - guitar and vocals
Ryan Scarbrough- drums
Scott Krueckeberg - bass
Nick Sommers - guitar
Kyle Mayfield - guitar

Discography 
Virgin Millionaires (2007)
Facedown (2009 City Hands)
Murdered Out (2011 City Hands)

References

External links

External links 
 at YouTube

<>

Musical groups from Indianapolis
Alternative rock groups from Indiana